Iridium acetylacetonate is the iridium coordination complex with the formula Ir(O2C5H7)3, which is sometimes known as Ir(acac)3.  The molecule has D3-symmetry.  It is a yellow-orange solid that is soluble in organic solvents.

Preparation and isomerism
It is prepared from IrCl3(H2O)3 and acetylacetone. The complex has been resolved into individual enantiomers by separation of its adduct with dibenzoyltartaric acid.

A second linkage isomers is also known. In the second isomer one of the acetylacetonate ligands is bonded to Ir through carbon.

Uses
The O6-bonded isomer has been investigated for use chemical vapor deposition (CVD). One example is the deposition of red phosphorescent emitter compounds used in OLEDs.

The C-bonded isomer has been investigated as a catalyst for C-H activation reactions.

References

Iridium compounds
Acetylacetonate complexes